Annmaree Roberts (born 3 November 1976 in Melbourne) is an Australian sport shooter. She competed at the Summer Olympics in 1996 and 2000. In 1996, she placed seventh in the women's double trap event; in 2000, she tied for ninth place in the women's double trap event.

References

1976 births
Living people
Trap and double trap shooters
Australian female sport shooters
Shooters at the 1996 Summer Olympics
Shooters at the 2000 Summer Olympics
Olympic shooters of Australia
20th-century Australian women
21st-century Australian women